Titan-Barrikady is a military-industrial company based in Volgograd, Russia. It was formed in 1914, after the merger between the Barrikady Production Association and the Titan Design Bureau. It is a subsidiary of the Moscow Institute of Thermal Technology.

History
The plant was established in 1914 as the Tsaritsyn Weapons Factory, and renamed Red Barricades after the Russian Revolution. It was for a time the largest munition factory in Europe. Titan had its origins as the factory's design bureau.

The factory was overrun and destroyed by the Germans in 1942 during Fall Blau, but resumed production in 1944.

In 1975 the plant was selected to manufacture the gun and mount for the 2S7 Pion.

The Titan Design Bureau was separated from the factory in 1990.

Barrikady plant
Barrikady is a major manufacturer of heavy machinery and large steel castings and forgings. Its manufacturing facilities include the Barrikady Drilling Equipment Plant, one of two large producers of oil drilling rigs in Russia (the other being Uralmash in Yekaterinburg).

Barrikady assembles mobile launchers for ballistic missiles and artillery pieces. Barrikady is located near the large Krasny Oktyabr Steel Plant.

In July 2019, the Barrikady plant assembled a new, fully low floor tram of the model 71-142.

References

External links
 Official website
 

Mechanical engineering companies of Russia
Companies based in Volgograd Oblast
Moscow Institute of Thermal Technology